The 7th Virginia Regiment was raised on January 11, 1776, at Gloucester, Virginia, for service with the Continental Army. The regiment would see action at the Battle of Brandywine, Battle of Germantown (after which it wintered at Valley Forge), Battle of Monmouth and the Siege of Charleston. Most of the regiment was captured at Charlestown, South Carolina, on May 12, 1780, by the British and the regiment was formally disbanded on January 1, 1783. A 3rd Virginia Detachment made up of the 7th Virginia Regiment was at the Waxhaw Massacre in 1780.

References

Further reading
Cecere, Michael. Captain Thomas Posey and the 7th Virginia Regiment. Westminster, MD: Heritage Books, 2005. .

Andrew Burstein, The Passions of Andrew Jackson (New York: Random House, 2003), 8.  Tarleton is described as “a twenty-six-year-old terrorist who dressed the part of a dandy in tight breeches and tall black boots and directed his men to slash and stab and spare no one.”

James Patton, The Life of Andrew Jackson (New York: Mason Bros., 1869), 89. Andrew Jackson Future president was working with his mother to saves the lives of the men left for dead from the Waxhaws Massacre. When he was ordered to shine the boots of a British officer that was under Banister Tarleton's command and when he did not comply was slashed over the head by that British officer for having the temerity to refuse the demand to clean his boots.  Tarleton was reprimanded by Cornwallis for killing wounded soldiers, civilians, captured Soldiers (Calling them traitors, suppliers, supporter or spies) because from his own words did not want to fight the same men again. It wasted his manpower taking prisoners to see them exchanged to fight them again.  His cavalry code is self-evident take no prisoners.

External links
A living history organization recreating the 7th Virginia Regiment
Bibliography of the Continental Army in Virginia compiled by the United States Army Center of Military History

Virginia regiments of the Continental Army
Military units and formations established in 1776
Military units and formations disestablished in 1780